Dolenje Zabukovje is a small settlement in the hills south of Mokronog in the Municipality of Mokronog-Trebelno in southeastern Slovenia. The area is part of the historical region of Lower Carniola. The municipality is now included in the Southeast Slovenia Statistical Region.

References

External links
Dolenje Zabukovje on Geopedia

Populated places in the Municipality of Mokronog-Trebelno